Anthony Wallace (born January 26, 1989) is an American soccer player who plays as a left back and midfielder.

Career

Professional
Wallace signed with Major League Soccer as a Generation Adidas player and was selected by FC Dallas as the ninth overall pick in the 2007 MLS SuperDraft. After making six appearances for Dallas' reserve team, Wallace made his debut for Dallas on September 15, 2007, in a 4-2 defeat to New England Revolution.

Wallace was traded to Colorado Rapids on July 30, 2010 in exchange for a fourth-round selection in the 2011 MLS SuperDraft and a conditional selection in the 2012 MLS SuperDraft. On November 24, 2010, Wallace was selected by Portland Timbers in the 2010 MLS Expansion Draft but then immediately traded back to Colorado in exchange for allocation money. While with Colorado Wallace was limited to 23 league matches due to injuries but was a starter for the club during the 2010 MLS Cup Playoffs in which Colorado captured its first MLS Cup.
He signed with NASL club Tampa Bay Rowdies on February 10, 2014. On May 24, 2014 Wallace scored his first goal as a professional in a 3-2 victory over rival Fort Lauderdale Strikers. In his one year with Tampa Bay Wallace appeared in 25 league matches and scored one goal.

On March 27, 2015 Wallace signed with New York Red Bulls of Major League Soccer after a successful trial spell. The following day Wallace made his debut with New York, starting in a 2-1 victory over the Columbus Crew. On July 11, 2015 Wallace scored his first goal for New York in a 4-1 victory over New England Revolution. On August 15, 2015 Wallace scored the second goal of the match for New York in a 3-0 victory over Toronto FC.

During the season Wallace was loaned out to New York Red Bulls affiliate New York Red Bulls II. On May 3, 2015 Wallace scored his first goal  for New York Red Bulls II in a 3-2 victory over Pittsburgh Riverhounds, scoring the winning goal in stoppage time.

On 10 June 2016, Wallace signed for Jacksonville Armada.

Wallace spent the 2017 season with USL side Oklahoma City Energy, but was released on November 21, 2017.

International
Wallace played for the United States Under-17 and Under-18 teams and was a member of the USA Under-20 National squad in the 2007 FIFA U-20 World Cup held in Canada. He played in two of the Group matches against Poland
 and also played in the knockout stages against Uruguay. Wallace earned his first cap for the senior team in 2011.

References

External links

1989 births
Living people
FC Dallas players
Colorado Rapids players
Tampa Bay Rowdies players
New York Red Bulls players
New York Red Bulls II players
Jacksonville Armada FC players
OKC Energy FC players
American soccer players
African-American soccer players
South Florida Bulls men's soccer players
FC Dallas draft picks
Major League Soccer players
North American Soccer League players
USL Championship players
United States men's youth international soccer players
United States men's under-20 international soccer players
United States men's international soccer players
Soccer players from St. Petersburg, Florida
2009 CONCACAF U-20 Championship players
Association football defenders